The World Evangelical Alliance (WEA) is an interdenominational organization of evangelical Christian churches, serving more than 600 million evangelicals, founded in 1846 in London, England, United Kingdom to unite evangelicals worldwide. WEA is the largest international organization of evangelical churches. The headquarters are in Deerfield, Illinois, with UN offices in New York City, Geneva, and Bonn. It brings together 9 regional and 143 national evangelical alliances of churches, and over one hundred member organizations. Moreover, the WEA includes a certain percentage of individual evangelical Christian churches. As of March 2021, the Secretary General of the WEA is German theologian Thomas Schirrmacher.

History
The organization has its origins in the Evangelical Alliance, a British organization founded in 1846 by 52 evangelical denominations in London, England. In 1912, it took the name of World Evangelical Alliance.  In 1951, the World Evangelical Fellowship was founded by evangelical leaders from 21 countries at the first general assembly in Woudschoten (Zeist) in the Netherlands.  In 2001, after the General Assembly in Kuala Lumpur, WEF became the World Evangelical Alliance. As of 2005, the WEA was experiencing a collegiate management under the leadership of its Canadian leader, Geoff Tunnicliffe. Offices were opened in Vancouver, Canada (Leadership), San Francisco (Information Technology), Washington (Publications), and Geneva (International Relations). In 2006, it opened an office at the UN in Geneva, which added to that in New York City. In 2018, it established its headquarters in Deerfield, Illinois, United States.

Beliefs 
The Alliance has an evangelical confession of faith.

Leadership 
The governance of the organization is ensured by a Secretary-General and regional secretaries in the 9 continental member regions. German Thomas Schirrmacher has been the Secretary-General since March 1, 2021.

List of former leaders
This list contains the former leaders of the WEA since 1951.

 Roy Cattell (United Kingdom) and J. Elwin Wright (United States), co-secretaries, (1951–1953)
 A.J. Dain (United Kingdom) and J. Elwin Wright (United States), co-secretaries, (1953–1958)
 Fred Ferris (United States), International Secretary, United States, (1958–1962)
 Gilbert Kirby (United Kingdom), International Secretary, (1962–1966)
 Dennis Clark (Canada), International Secretary, (1966–1970)
 Gordon Landreth (United Kingdom), interim International Secretary, (1970–1971)
 Clyde Taylor (United States), International Secretary, (1971–1975)
 Waldron Scott (United States), General Secretary, (1975–1980)
 Wade Coggins (United States), Interim General Secretary, (1981)
 David M. Howard (United States), International Director (1982–1992)
 Agustin Vencer (Philippines), International Director (1992–2001)
 Gary Edmonds (United States), Secretary General (2002–2004)
 Geoff Tunnicliffe (Canada, Secretary General (2005–2014)
 Efraim Tendero (Philippines), Secretary General (2015–2021)
Thomas Schirrmacher (Germany), Secretary General (2021–)

Commissions
In 1974, the WEA created six commissions to better achieve its mandates.

 Alliance developmentFunction: To strengthen existing evangelical alliances and create new ones.

 Church in communityFunction: To provide programs and resources to churches for different social groups.

 Missions and evangelismFunction: Coordinate the activities of evangelization.

 Public engagementFunction: Coordinate partnerships with international organizations, such as the UN.

 Relief and developmentFunction: Coordinate Christian humanitarian aid and development aid.

 Theological concernsFunction: To reflect on subjects of evangelical theology, and questions of importance concerning churches and society in the world, to monitor religious freedom.

Statistics 
In 2020, WEA brought together 143 national alliances of churches that would have 600 million believers. Moreover, the WEA unites only a certain percentage of evangelical churches, because some churches are not members of a Christian denomination or national alliance.

Membership 
The World Evangelical Alliance embraces member-bodies whose identity and vocation are rooted in what it understands as historic biblical Christianity. WEA affirms and seeks the biblical unity of Christ's body, the Church, celebrating the diversity of practices and theological emphases consistent with the WEA Statement of Faith, recognizing the existing dynamic tension between unity and diversity.

There are three types of membership, each with its distinct qualifications and responsibilities: 
 Regional and national alliances are regional evangelical fellowships and their national fellowships/alliances.
 Affiliate members are independently incorporated organizations with their own specific ministries and accountability, an international scope of ministry, and the capacity and authority to serve in and beyond the WEA community.
 Church networks and denominations are networks of churches (located in one or a number of countries), in agreement with the statement of faith and objectives of the World Evangelical Alliance.

General Assemblies 
A General Assembly takes place every six years in a country that differs depending on the year. It is a time of prayer and conferences for national alliances and associations. It is an opportunity for decision making and the training of leaders of each country. The last GA was held in 2019 in Jakarta in Indonesia and the leaders notably committed to building alliances in the 62 countries that do not have them and getting more involved in the  religious freedom. 

 1951 Amsterdam (Woudschoten), Netherlands, August 4–11
 1953 Clarens, Switzerland, July 27–31
 1956 Rhode Island, United States, August 27–31
 1962 Hong Kong, April 25-May 2
 1968 Lausanne, Switzerland, May 4–10
 1974 Château d'Oex, Switzerland, July 25–29
 1980 London (Hoddesdon) England, UK, March 24–28
 1986 Singapore, June 23–27
 1992 Manila, Philippines, June 21–26
 1997 Abbotsford, British Columbia, Canada, May 8–15 
 2001 Kuala Lumpur, Malaysia, May 4–10
 2008 Pattaya, Thailand, October 25–30
 2019 Jakarta, Indonesia, November 7–14

Publications 
There are two quarterly publications: a journal Evangelical Review of Theology (published on behalf by Paternoster Periodicals since 1977) and a newsletter Theological News (since 1969). Books are published occasionally.

Global engagements

Development
The fight against poverty is a major concern of the WEA. Publications and meetings of the Alliance are the means used to influence and inspire development initiatives and actions humanitarian in churches, NGOs and political. It is the origin of the Micah Challenge, an initiative to educate Christians and promote decision making among leaders.

Ecumenical participation
On June 5, 2010, Geoff Tunnicliffe, the International Director of the WEA, appeared alongside the leaders of the Pontifical Council for Promoting Christian Unity and the World Council of Churches (WCC) in a press conference, entitled  “Christian unity today”, at the Edinburgh 2010 Conference. The gathering marked the centennial of the 1910 World Missionary Conference. In the same year, on 17 October 2010, Olav Fykse Tveit, the general secretary of the WCC, gave an invited address to the 3rd International Congress of the Lausanne Movement. In the address he said, "we are called to participate in the one mission of God". The World Evangelical Alliance, Geoff Tunnicliffe, the International Director and other WEA leaders were involved at each level in the development of the programme, and helped choose its participants. In May 2014 the Lausanne International Student Ministry Global Leadership Network became a "docked network" with the WEA's Mission Commission.

On 22 January 2015, the WCC and WEA announced plans for closer cooperation, worship and witness. In the same year, in June 2015, the WEA reported that discussions with the Pontifical Council for Promoting Christian Unity were finalised, and that "the open questions of the 16th century are almost answered". The WEA representatives also reported that "still open is the question to what extend [sic] evangelical Christians who stem from the reformation churches have full access to salvation according to the catholic view".

On May 24, 2017, the WEA participated in a two-day Global Christian Forum meeting with the World Council of Churches, officials from the Vatican and Eastern Orthodox Churches, and the Pentecostal World Federation to facilitate moves 'towards greater oneness in Christ'. The meeting was held at the WCC's Bossey Ecumenical Institute. Some criticism was voiced of the WEA for lack of consultation about this move, the absence of regional and national discussion, or a vote of the General Assembly prior to the meeting.

Advocacy for human rights and freedom of religion 
The WEA is also advocating for the respect of human rights, including freedom of religion and belief for all. Furthermore, its involvement with UN mechanisms (Human Rights and other) has grown into a dedicated department, the "Global Advocacy Department".

The WEA has consultative status with the Economic and Social Council of the UN (ECOSOC) since 1997, which allows it to engage in the UN mechanisms with statements, reports, and recommendations, notably as part of the Human Rights Council sessions and the Universal Periodic Review (UPR).

In the context of the UPR, several recommendations from the WEA have been reiterated by States, meaning that recommendations formulated in a very similar way than those suggested by the WEA, appear in the final recommendations addressed to the State under review, on behalf of a reviewing State. This was the case for its reports regarding human trafficking in Switzerland (2012) and Canada (2018), its report on religious freedom in Bhutan in 2019, and its report on Iran in 2020 for which the WEA successfully advocated for the inclusion of “Christian converts” as a group whose religious freedom should be respected by Iran.

Regarding the Human Rights Council sessions, an example of the WEA’s impact was reported by Evangelical Focus. In 2020, the WEA made a statement, as part of the UPR's outcome adoption of Spain, mentioning unreasonably high standards for non-Catholic religious communities in Catalonia and discrimination against retired Protestant pastors who have been excluded from the pension system since Franco’s regime. The Spanish ambassador responded to WEA’s statement at the Human Rights Council session and both recommendations were accepted. At the end of 2020, the Evangelical Council of Catalonia announced that an agreement had been reached with the municipality of L'Hospitalet de Llobregat to avoid the closure of five churches.

Criticism

Neglect of the suffering church in China
The WEA was criticised for its positive assessment of the situation of the churches in China, after meeting with government-approved representatives in 2009.  China Aid and Church in Chains claimed, "There are many Christians in China who are not free to worship, do not have Bibles of their own and are not free to organise their own affairs and this situation is not mentioned in your press release… our concern is that you have turned your back on these brothers and sisters." One exemplary case of abuse, that of the imprisoned Uyghur Christian, Alimujiang Yimiti, was raised in the criticism, but the WEA did not respond in detail.

See also
 List of the largest Protestant bodies
 Bible
 Born again
 Worship service (evangelicalism)
 God in Christianity
 Believers' Church

References

External links

1846 establishments in the United Kingdom
International bodies of evangelical denominations
Organizations based in New York (state)